Italy has always been a country rich in real estate, in particular, luxury property.

History
During the centuries, Italy, for mild climate and for the great variety of climatic environments, offered the perfect place for the construction of luxury real estate and of great artistic and cultural value.

Roman Empire
The first historical examples of luxury houses or luxury villas, are from the period of the Roman Empire.
In particular, the villas of Roman Emperors, represented the quintessential luxury.
Today some are protected as Heritage archaeological of inestimable value and as UNESCO World Heritage Site, as, for example, Hadrian's Villa.

At Capri, the Roman Emperor Tiberius had built 12 villas.
The archaeological remains are scattered throughout the island, but they are, however, only 3 villas that have preserved the original structure still visible: Villa Jovis, Villa Damecuta and Palazzo a Mare.

Luxury Real Estate
The word itself luxury derived from the Latin luxus, and associated with real estate, indicates today in Italy, a category of properties of particular value and of high historical and artistic value.

Middle Ages

The dissolution of the Western Roman Empire brings in Italy the creation of many barbarian kingdoms, as, for example, Kingdom of the Lombards, that evolved over the centuries in feudal lordships.
During this period were built the medieval villages with fortified walls and towers.
Because of widespread fragmentation in kingdoms and feudal lords, often at war with each other, were built castles and fortresses, often embedded in medieval villages.
Today some are protected as Heritage of inestimable value and as UNESCO World Heritage Site, as, for example, The "Historic Centre of San Gimignano",  in Tuscany.

Renaissance

Early modern

Modern

References

External links
 ASSOIMMOBILIARE, Italian Real Estate Industry Association